La Düsseldorf was a German band, consisting of onetime Kraftwerk drummer and Neu! multi-instrumentalist Klaus Dinger and occasional Neu! collaborators Thomas Dinger and Hans Lampe.  La Düsseldorf was formed after Neu! disbanded following the release of their Neu! '75 record.  They released a string of successful albums (with sales totaling over a million) during the late 1970s and early 1980s, and were considered highly influential by Brian Eno and David Bowie, with Bowie going so far as calling La Düsseldorf "the soundtrack of the eighties".

Overview

Core members 
 Klaus Dinger – vocals, guitars, keyboards
 Thomas Dinger – vocals, percussion
 Hans Lampe  – percussion, electronics

Other members 
 Harald Konietzko (1978) – bass
 Andreas Schell (1978) – piano
 Nikolaus Van Rhein (1976–1981) – keyboards (this is a pseudonym of Klaus Dinger.)

Discography

Albums 
 1976 – La Düsseldorf (Teldec Records)
 1978 – Viva (Teldec Records)
 1980 – Individuellos (Teldec Records)

The following albums were released by Klaus Dinger without the participation of any other band members. Due to legal disputes, the albums could not be released under the La Düsseldorf name, but were subtitled "La Düsseldorf 4" and "La Düsseldorf 5" respectively.

 1985 – Neondian (Teldec Records, released under the name "Klaus Dinger and Rheinita Bella Düsseldorf")
 1999 – Blue (Captain Trip Records, recorded between 1985 and 1987, released under the name "La! Neu?")

In 2006 Klaus Dinger sought to revive La Düsseldorf properly, but was again blocked by legal problems. He instead chose to release under the name "La-duesseldorf.de" (also the name of his most recent website) or "Klaus Dinger + Japandorf". This project features only Klaus of the original band.

 2006 – Mon Amour (Warner Music, a re-release of Neondian with extra tracks that was only briefly in print)
 2013 – Japandorf

Singles 
 1976 – "Silver Cloud/La Düsseldorf" (Teldec Records)
 1978 – "Rheinita/Viva" (Teldec Records)
 1980 – "Dampfriemen/Individuellos" (Teldec Records)
 1983 – "Ich Liebe Dich (Teil 1)/Ich Liebe Dich (Teil 2)" (Teldec Records)

Maxi-singles
 1978 – "Rheinita/Viva" (Teldec Records)
 1980 – "Dampfriemen/Individuellos" (Teldec Records)
 1983 – "Ich liebe Dich/Koksknödel" (Teldec Records)

Video
 2004 – Rheinita 1979 (a live performance of Rheinita that can be viewed for free on Klaus Dinger's website
Romantic Warriors IV: Krautrock (2019)

The booklets of "Neondian" and "Blue" also hint at the existence of videos for "America" (Neondian) and "Ich Liebe Dich" (single) although neither have been released.

See also 
 Amon Düül II (aka Amon Duul II)
 Ash Ra Tempel
 Can (band)
 Cluster (band)
 Cosmic Jokers
 Faust (band)
 Harmonia (band)
 Hawkwind
 Kraftwerk
 La! Neu?
 Neu!
 Popol Vuh (German band)

References

External links
La Düsseldorf site 
DingerLand "Official" Klaus Dinger site
Klaus Dinger records
A Taste of Krautrock by Patrick O'Hearn, Perfect Sound Forever, November 1997
Article at Prog Archives
Myspace site

Musical groups established in 1975
German electronic music groups
Krautrock musical groups
Musical groups from Düsseldorf
Radar Records artists
Decca Records artists
1975 establishments in West Germany